Fien van Eynde (born 8 September 1998) is a Belgian professional racing cyclist, who currently rides for UCI Women's Continental Team . She rode in the women's road race event at the 2020 UCI Road World Championships.

She won a silver medal in the 2022 Belgian National Road Race Championships.

References

External links

(in Dutch:) Gewezen handbalspeelster is Belgisch vice-kampioene op de weg: “Ontgoocheld, maar niet de sterkste”, by Hans Fruyt, 27-06-2022, Wielerverhaal

1998 births
Living people
Belgian female cyclists
Place of birth missing (living people)
21st-century Belgian women